A corporation's share capital, commonly referred to as capital stock in the United States, is the portion of a corporation's equity that has been derived by the issue of shares in the corporation to a shareholder, usually for cash. "Share capital" may also denote the number and types of shares that compose a corporation's share structure.

Definition
In accounting, the share capital of a corporation is the nominal value of issued shares (that is, the sum of their par values, sometimes indicated on share certificates). If the allocation price of shares is greater than the par value, as in a rights issue, the shares are said to be sold at a premium (variously called share premium, additional paid-in capital or paid-in capital in excess of par). Commonly, the share capital is the total of the nominal share capital and the premium share capital. Most jurisdictions do not allow a company to issue shares below par value, but if permitted they are said to be issued at a discount or part-paid.

Legal capital
Legal capital is a concept used in European corporate and foundation law, United Kingdom company law, and various other corporate law jurisdictions to refer to the sum of assets contributed to a company by shareholders when they are issued shares. The law often requires that this capital is maintained, and that dividends are not paid when a company is not showing a profit above the level of historically recorded legal capital.

See also
 Balance sheet
 Capital impairment
 Market capitalization
 Paid in capital
 Share dilution
 Share premium account

References

Corporate law
Financial capital